Triple yin yang may refer to:

the Korean Sam Saeg-ui Taegeuk
the Tibetan Buddhist Gankyil
various forms of triskelion